Himachal Road Transport Corporation, also referred to as HRTC, is the state-owned road transport corporation of the state of Himachal Pradesh, India. HRTC provides bus services to towns and cities within Himachal Pradesh and the adjoining and nearby states of Uttarakhand, Punjab, Haryana, Delhi, Uttar Pradesh, Jammu and Kashmir and Rajasthan. HRTC is one of the first RTC's in India to offer a facility for online booking of tickets for all types of buses.

History
The corporation was jointly founded by the Government of Punjab, Government of Himachal Pradesh and Railways as Mandi-Kullu Road Transport Corporation in 1958 to operate in Punjab and Himachal Pradesh. The corporation was merged with Himachal Govt. Transport
on 2 October 1974 and was renamed as Himachal Road Transport Corporation.

Supporting infrastructure
HRTC has its corporate office at Shimla and four divisional offices at Shimla, Mandi, Hamirpur and Dharamshala, each having integrated workshop. It has 31 depots each with a regional workshop. HRTC also owns 3 bus body building units along with 3 tyre pre-cure re-treading plants at Mandi, Parwanoo and Jassur.
HRTC routinely upgrades driving skills of its staff and train new drivers at its Driver Training Institutes located at Jassur, Mandi, Taradevi, Hamirpur, Chamba, Sarkaghat and Kullu.

Operating Conditions 
Other than regular services connecting Himachal to Chandigarh, Delhi and Haridwar; HRTC operates buses on some of the highest motorable roads in the world. These routes include Leh-Delhi, Shimla-Kaza, Kullu-Kaza, Manali – Reckongpeo and others. The Leh-Delhi routes operated by HRTC is 1203 km long and is the longest route by any RTC in India with a travel time of approx.  36 hours. The roads to Keylong & leh are also termed as the world's most treacherous roads.

Fleet

HRTC has a fleet of 3358 buses & categorize its buses into 5 categories as 
 HIMSUTA- Volvo Buses & Scania AB buses
 HIMGAURAV- Isuzu and Deluxe AC buses
 HIMMANI-Ashok Leyland Deluxe (Non-AC) buses
 HIM TARANG- (Electric buses)
 HIM DHARA-(AC-ORDINARY 3×2) Ashok Leyland
 ORDINARY and mini/local city buses Tata Marcopolo,Ashok Leyland[that ply in association with JnNURM to fulfill urban transportation needs.]

HIMSUTA (HRTC Volvo & Scania AB) 

HRTC was the first operator in North India to start Volvo services on Shimla-Delhi and Manali-Delhi routes in 2005 on trial basis. The total Volvo  and Scania AB fleet currently stands at 100+ buses with daily buses running from Delhi to Shimla, Manali, Dharamshala, Joginder Nagar, Baijnath, Hamirpur, Nalagarh, Chintpurni, Jawala ji, Pathankot, Chamba, Palampur, Rewalsar, Bir, Rohru, Jispa, and Sarkaghat. Also some new routes are started from Chandigarh Airport to Shimla, Manali, Dharmshala. Also new route started from Mata Vaishno Devi Katra to Shimla. HRTC's 'Himsuta' bus fleet include the Volvo 9400 model made on B7R chassis and Scania AB Metrolink HD 12.0m. These 12 meter buses have ten rows of luxury semi-sleeper seats and charging ports. Additional facilities include free Wifi, entertainment on board and water bottles. The buses are also equipped with CCTV camera's for passenger security.

HIMGAURAV (Air-conditioned Deluxe buses) 

HRTC operates air-conditioned Deluxe buses with 2X2 seating configuration on all important routes including Delhi-Shimla, Delhi-Manali, Delhi-Dharamshala and others. The buses also run on a few intrastate routes including Manali-Shimla. Besides the 11.4 meter luxury Isuzu buses, this class also includes buses built by JCBL and Amar on 210", 243" and 222" WB chassis by TATA or Ashok Leyland. The buses are provided with  35 comfortable and luxurious passenger seats with pushback.

HIM-MANI (NON AC – Deluxe buses) 

HRTC operates Deluxe buses with 2X2 seating configuration on Delhi-Dehra, Delhi-Shimla, Delhi-Manali, Delhi-Dharamshala, Delhi-Joginder nagar, Delhi-Baijnath, Delhi-Dharampur, Chamba-Shimla , Chamba-Deheradun ,Deheradun-Shimla and Manali-Shimla routes. The buses are provided with  31 comfortable and luxurious passenger seats with pushback. Along with LED facility, charging ports are available for each seat.

ORDINARY Buses 

HRTC operates 47 and 37 seater ordinary buses on all routes. The buses come in 2X3 seating configuration and ply on ordinary fare. The buses are manufactured by ACGL and Tata Marcopolo on TATA 1512 and 1613 chassis, New Ashok Leyland BS6(added in June 2022) .

JnNURM (City buses) 

The bus are purchased from TATA and Ashok-leyland. The buses are provided with  2X2 passenger seats. The buses are fitted with digital destination boards. The buses are also fitted with air Brakes and power steering. and a new technology is added like automated doors etc.

HIM-DHARA (AC-ORDINARY Buses)
Made by Ashok Leyland and Body by Prakash. Purchased in may/June 2022. Currently in operation.Some routes are Joginder Nagar-Chandigarh, Mandi-Delhi, Sundernagar-Chamba, Shimla-Delhi, Palampur-Delhi, Joginder Nagar- Ludhiana, Mcleodganj-Delhi, Manali-Jammu, Dharampur-Delhi, Hamirpur-Delhi,Dehradun-chandigarh,Poanta sahib-Delhi,Shimla-Dehradun etc. Seat capacity is 51. Buses are provided with 3×2 passenger seat. Air conditioning above every seat and 2 USB post in every column.2 cctvs, first aids and co2 cylinders. Bus is BS6 type and have 2 entry gates.

HIM TARANG (Electric buses) 

Made by Goldstone, the buses are capable of running 250 km on a single charge. However, that depends on road conditions and driving style. Apart from the zero emission completely electric, the bus also comes equipped with several advanced technologies. Named as ‘Him Tarang’ the bus runs between the Manali and Rohtang Pass as part of the state government's initiative to save the environment. It covers this 50 km route regularly which is very popular among the tourists. With the initiative, this electric bus is the first zero emission bus that runs at the highest place anywhere in the world. Also, recently it has been introduced in local routes in Shimla.

List of depots with Division 
Following are the HRTC depots Of Himachal Pradesh:

References

External links
Official website
Association of State Road Transport Undertakings (ASRTU)

State agencies of Himachal Pradesh
State road transport corporations of India
Transport in Himachal Pradesh
1958 establishments in Himachal Pradesh
Government agencies established in 1958
Transport companies established in 1958
Indian companies established in 1958